Mount Lolo, 218m is a summit in Sayward Land District on the west side of Quadra Island, British Columbia, Canada, overlooking Seymour Narrows.

Name origin
Mount Lolo is said to be named after Jean Baptiste Lolo, a fur trader and interpreter at Fort Kamloops.

References

Lolo
Landforms of the Discovery Islands